131. Fighter Escadrille was a unit of the Polish Air Force at the start of the Second World War. The unit was attached to the Poznań Army.

Equipment

10 PZL P.11c airplanes.

Air Crew
Commanding officer: kpt. pil. Jerzy Zaremba
Deputy Commander: por. pil. Zbigniew Moszyński

Pilots:

 ppor. Włodzimierz Gedymin
 ppor. Lech Grzybowski
 ppor. Zbigniew Rowiński (reserve)
 ppor. Aleksander Wróblewski (reserve)
 pchor. Alfons Kabat
 pchor. Florian Kortus
 pchor. Mirosław Nowak
 pchor. Jerzy Salski
 kpr. pchor. rez. Bolesław Rychlicki
 kpr. Tomasz Gabryel
 kpr. Brunon Kroczyński
 kpr. Stanisław Matuszak
 kpr. Romuald Żerkowski

See also
Polish Air Force order of battle in 1939

References
 

Polish Air Force escadrilles